Arnheim may refer to:

 Arnheim (surname)
 Arnheim, Michigan
 Arnheim, Ohio
 Arnheim (Radford, Virginia)

See also
 "The Domain of Arnheim" (1847), a short story by Edgar Allan Poe
 "Domain of Arnheim" (1938-1962), a series of paintings by René Magritte
 "From the Domain of Arnheim" (first published in The Second Life, 1968), a poem by Edwin Morgan
 Arnhem (disambiguation)